Ludovic Franck (28 December 1907 – 15 September 1988) was a sailor from Belgium, who represented his country at the 1928 Summer Olympics in Amsterdam, Netherlands. Franck, as crew member on the Belgian 6 Metre Ubu, took 5th place with helmsman A. J. J. Fridt and fellow crew members Frits Mulder, Willy Van Rompaey and Arthur Sneyers. He also competed in the 6 Metre event at the 1948 Summer Olympics.

References

Sources 
 

1907 births
1988 deaths
Sailors at the 1928 Summer Olympics – 6 Metre
Sailors at the 1948 Summer Olympics – 6 Metre
Olympic sailors of Belgium
Belgian male sailors (sport)